Salinas is a Spanish municipality in the comarca of Alto Vinalopó, province of Alicante, Valencian Community.

References

Municipalities in the Province of Alicante